Jack Burke (born 12 June 1995) is a Canadian bicycle racer, who currently rides for UCI Continental team . In 2014, he was cleared of doping charges levied against him in the 2013 Tour de l'Alitibi.

Major results
2013
 2nd Time trial, National Junior Road Championships
 4th Overall Tour de l'Abitibi
1st Stage 3
2016
 2nd Time trial, National Under-23 Road Championships
2017
 4th Overall Tour de Beauce
 6th Overall Tour of Alberta
1st  Young rider classification
 6th Overall Grand Prix Cycliste de Saguenay
1st  Young rider classification
 9th Overall Joe Martin Stage Race
2018
 4th Overall Tour de Beauce
 10th Overall Tour of the Gila
2019
 4th Overall Tour du Jura Cycliste
 5th Time trial, National Road Championships

References

External links

1995 births
Canadian male cyclists
Living people
Sportspeople from Toronto
Cyclists from Ontario